Ponni Thirunaal is a 1960 Indian Tamil-language film produced and directed by A. K. Velan. The film stars Muthukrishnan, Rajasulochana and L. Vijayalakshmi.

Plot 

Vimala is the daughter of a rich man, Naganathar. She falls in love with a poor young man, Ponnan. Naganathar strongly opposes her marrying Ponnan. Naganathar employed some thugs and they attacked Ponnan, who then was admitted to a hospital. Vimala, in disguise, visits him in the hospital. Ponnan's father was afraid for his son's safety. So he sends Ponnan to serve in the army. Vimala writes a letter to Ponnan, but the letter falls into the hands of a conspirator. Meanwhile, Naganathar arranges a marriage to Vimala. She escapes and falls into the hands of the conspirator. However, everyone thinks Vimala has drowned in a river. Naganathar, unable to bear the loss of his daughter, donates his money by building schools, etc. Ponnan returns to the village and learns that Vimala is dead. He becomes ill due to sorrow and he convalesces at the house of Vimala's friend, Sarasa. Due to pressure from relatives, Ponnan agrees to marry Sarasa. But, on the day of the marriage, Vimala escapes from the clutches of the conspirator and returns only to see Ponnan and Sarasa ready to marry each other. What happens next forms the rest of the story.

Cast 
The cast was compiled from Film News Anandan's database.
 "Valaiyapathi" Muthukrishnan
 Pakkirisami
 Venkadachalam
 V. K. Ramasamy
 Rajasulochana
 L. Vijayalakshmi
 C. K. Saraswathi
 K. R. Ratnam
 Manorama
 Lakshmirajam

Soundtrack 
Music was composed by K. V. Mahadevan, while the lyrics were penned by Thanjai N. Ramaiah Dass, P. K. Muthusamy, A. Maruthakasi and Puthaneri Subramaniam. One Andal pasuram also was included in the film.

Reception 
The critic from The Indian Express said Rajasulochana "sparkles with her usual vivacity" in the role of an heiress.

References

External links 
 

1960s Tamil-language films
Films scored by K. V. Mahadevan